The newly created state of Indiana elected its sole member of the U.S. House of Representatives in August 1816, in advance of statehood, to represent .

Democratic-Republican William Hendricks was elected with 80.2% of the vote over Allen Thom who received 19.7% of the vote.

The state was admitted December 11, 1816 and the new member was admitted on that day to the 14th Congress which would end March 3, 1817.

Hendricks was re-elected August 4, 1817 to the 15th Congress.

See also 
 1816 and 1817 United States House of Representatives elections
 1817 United States House of Representatives election in Indiana
 List of United States representatives from Indiana

References 

1816
Indiana
United States House of Representatives